Laduani Airstrip , is an airport serving Aurora, Suriname.

Charters and destinations 

Charter Airlines serving this airport are:

See also

 List of airports in Suriname
 Transport in Suriname

References

External links
Ladouanie Airport
OurAirports - Ladouanie
OpenStreetMap - Ladouanie

Airports in Suriname
Sipaliwini District